Kimberley Frances Crossman (born May 1990) is a New Zealand actress and presenter who is best known for her role as Sophie McKay on the New Zealand soap opera Shortland Street. She is the co-founder of Joyable.

In August 2021, it was announced that she would feature in the 2021 Season of 
Celebrity Treasure Island 2021.

Early life
Crossman began dancing at age three, which was encouraged by her mother Jill Arkley who is a ballet teacher. In 2006, she was Deputy Head Girl at Diocesan School for Girls in Epsom, Auckland.

Cheerleading/dance
In 2006, she danced at the Royal New Zealand Ballet's season of Giselle.
She was captain of the Total Cheerleading Senior Elite team in 2005 when they toured the United States and came sixth in the World cheerleading championships.

In 2008, Crossman was part of 'Dziah 2 Dream', a ten-week program run by Dziah.

In March 2008, she travelled around the United States of America with the Total Cheerleading Senior Elite team and competed in the World cheerleading championships. She trained all year round and competed in America and Australia, as well as a few New Zealand competitions. In early 2008 the TCSE team took out the Down Under Spirit Championships in the Gold coast. The next project is to compete at the World Championship in 2009 in Florida.

Acting
In January 2007, she started her role as Sophie McKay on New Zealand's best known and longest running drama and soap opera Shortland Street. In March 2011 Crossman left Shortland Street and will be starting a new project early May as well as auditioning in America and Australia.

In October 2006, fans on Shortland Street fansite StreetTalk voted Crossman as Best rising star, and runner up for Hottest female.

In 2008, Crossman featured as Kerry Post in Beyond Belief, a short film in the 2008 48HOURS filmmaking competition, which was made by her former Shortland Street co-star Johnny Barker (aka Joey Henderson) and also featured another of her fellow Shortland Street co-stars, Will Hall (aka Dr. Kip Denton).
She has also featured in the special Nickelodeon Kids' Choice Awards programme in New Zealand.

Crossman was voted New Zealand's "next big thing" by fans in a local poll run in conjunction with the 2011 MTV Movie Awards.

Crossman stars as Stacey on the TV2 show Step Dave which launched on TV2 on 11 February 2014. She co-starred with Kate Elliott in the horror Heavy metal comedy film Deathgasm, and in the TV3 sketch comedy Funny Girls. Most recently she co-starred in Golden Boy.
In 2021 she co-starred with Jay Ryan in the romance movie "Together Forever Tea".

Hosting
Crossman was a presenter on The Erin Simpson Show, beginning in 2009. The Erin Simpson Show concluded in 2013 after a five-year run.

In 2010, Crossman travelled to Los Angeles to host a half-hour special for New Zealand audiences about the 2010 Teen Choice Awards.

She has also worked as a fill-in host on New Zealand radio station Classic Hits, periodically co-hosting the Auckland breakfast show with Jason Reeves and Justin Brown whilst usual host Stacey Morrison was on maternity leave in 2012.

Crossman is a co-presenter on the Cadbury Dream Factory which first aired in New Zealand on TV3 on 20 February 2014 alongside Brooke Howard-Smith, Guy Montgomery, Walter Neilands and Jesse Griffin.

Crossman is one of the rotating cast of hosts of the live trivia app Joyride. In October 2018, Crossman joined the co-star in the spinoff of 'The Middle' for ABC.

Filmography

Television

Film

Music videos
5 Star Fallout - "Perfect Kind of Pain"
Daecolm - "Love Thing"
False Start - "What Will It Be Like"
Secret Sky (Steven Skyler's band) - "The Secret"

References

External links
Official Website
 
Kimberley's Shortland Street Profile

Living people
1990 births
People from Auckland
New Zealand film actresses
New Zealand television actresses
New Zealand female dancers
New Zealand soap opera actresses
New Zealand people of English descent
People educated at Diocesan School for Girls, Auckland
New Zealand expatriate actresses in the United States
New Zealand cheerleaders
21st-century New Zealand actresses
21st-century New Zealand dancers